Harry Turner (27 September 1894 – 19 October 1976) was a Canadian boxer. He competed in the men's flyweight event at the 1920 Summer Olympics.

References

1894 births
1976 deaths
Canadian male boxers
Olympic boxers of Canada
Boxers at the 1920 Summer Olympics
Boxers from Montreal
Anglophone Quebec people
Flyweight boxers